Alfred James Dixon (1886–1935) was a British racing driver. He aided the development of both the motorcycle and motor car industries. He also helped establish the popularity of racing in Britain.

Early life

Dixon was born 21 October 1886 in St Pancras, the son of Alfred Archer Duxon, a publican, and Fanny Law, daughter of Richard Law. Richard was the publican of the Hare and Hounds in Layer Breton and had fought at the Battle of Sevastopol during Crimea War on board HMS Rodney. Educated at The Ongar Academy, he completed an apprenticeship with a railway company.

After leaving school, his father helped him establish a career in motorcycle racing. His father died in 1914 and Dixon inherited enough money to enable him to concentrate on his sport.

When war broke out in August 1914, he tried to join the Royal Flying Corps, but was too heavy, so he joined the army as a dispatch rider. He served in France in the 101 (City of London) Engineer Regiment in September 1915 but was discharged 4 May 1916, believed to be injured. He was awarded the Victory, British and Star medals.
 
On his return to England, he worked for Singer as an engineer in Coventry. Here he met and subsequently married Gertrude Annie Elkington. They had three children - Nora, Alfred Patrick John (Paddy) were born in Coventry. They moved from Coventry to Enfield, where he was the licensee of the White House pub and their third child was born - Phyllis Mary. Dixon became a Freemason at Thobalds lodge, then grand master. After the Depression they bought a confectionery business in Clacton-on-Sea, on the site of the old Mazzolini's cafe and called it the Criterion.

Motorcycling career

Dixon competed in many events in England, France and the UK winning medals. Atkinson in his book "The Singer Story" said that "in 1912, the most successful rider was G. E. Stanley, but also very successful were Jimmy Crocker, W A Jacobs and a man who would later progress to driving racing cars for Singer, Arthur J. J.(sic) Dixon.

His favourite bike was a Singer 3 1/2 hp machine, but he also rode a Rudge.  Some of the known events that he competed in include:

1912 - Gaillon Hill Climb (France)

1913 - Bristol Motorcycle & Motor Club: Open Hill Climb June 23rd; Milan – Torina – Bologna - Torina endurance race; Hertfordshire MCC Speed Trials in Lutton Hoo Park "Class Ic. Racing Single Cylinder to 300 c.c.  A. J. Dixon . . Singer . . FIRST.  Class 3 c. Racing Single Cylinder to 500 c.c.  A. J. Dixon . . Singer . ."; Scottish Six days Trial July 1913

Speed Trials at Colwyn Bay.

1914 - Paris - Nice – Monte Carlo Trial. He won a cup but with the outbreak of the war, he buried the cup and returned after the war to collect it.   Midland Cycling and Athletic Club 24 hour trial race. And he took part in the Herts County A.C in January riding a Rudge.

1924: Dixon competed in the Midland Cycling and Athletic Clun

Dixon was a member of the Motor Cycling Club and attended their 1913 Annual Dinner that was held at the Trocadero Restaurant. The photographs show the menu card that Dixon kept. It has signatures of the leading lights if the motorcycle world who became really big in the motor trade - Charles Jarrott who became head of the Automobile Association; Lionel Martin and Robert Bamford who went on to start Aston Martin. . The menu was donated to the National Motorcycle Museum by the family in 2019.

Cyclecar career 

The purpose of a cyclecar was to fill a gap in the market between the motorcycle and the car.  The first cycle cars appeared in 1910. In 1911 the number of cyclecar manufacturers was less than a dozen in Britain and in France. By 1914, there were over 100 manufacturers in each country, as well as others in Germany, Austria, and other European countries, and in the United States.

At the 1912 Cycle and Motor Cycle Show, Singer unveiled its new baby car. Atkinson  stated that the new car was of lightweight construction with an overall weight of mo more than six hundredweight with a top speed of 40mph and using only 40 mpg. A cyclecar, according to the Auto Cycle Union had an engine of less than 1100cc in a car which weighed less than 7 cwt

Dixon threw himself into the cyclecar movement, joining the Cyclecar Club and he bought his own car - a Coventry Premier, made by Singer.

Some of the events that he competed in were:

1921 London to Land's End Trial - Dixon took part in this trial in his Singer 10HP. This was the only Singer in the race. The combination of an appalling surface and the severe gradient proved too much for the Singer. Dixon  managed 15 mph, so only got a silver medal. 

1921 Midlands Light Car Club 1 day Reliability Trial This race was held 23 April 1912. It started at the Austin factory at Longbridge in Birmingham and proceeded south through Worcestershire to the Malvern Hills. Dixon and his friend and mechanic R. Croucher entered in a Coventry Premier three—wheeler. Dixon received a silver medal because he faltered on the old Wyche cutting when he failed to climb the 1 in 2.9 hill.

1921 200-mile race at Brooklands This race was the first of its kind and was organised by the Junior Car Club and was held in October It was the first long-distance race held England. The actual distance was to be 901 miles 189 yards, and there were two classes, up to 1,100 cc and 1101-1500 cc.  The starters were drawn up at the Fork in four lines, the first row leaving at mid-day, the remaining rows being flagged off at intervals. Cars allocated to the first row were to sport at least two feet of yellow paint on their bonnets, those in the second row red, those in the third green, and those unfortunates in the last row white. Mechanics had to be carried because they could help their driver at the pits. Dixon finished 4th in his class. This was also the first race in which he drove a four-wheeled car. Before this time he driven the three-wheeled Singer.

Atkinson mistakenly identified another Singer works entry was that of the Coventry Premier driven by Arthur (which should read Alfred) Dixon. It was a works entry, that would indicate that Dixon was part of the Singer company. Dixon's car wore a number 8 for the race was basically standard even down to its disk wheels. A Goodwin was the mechanic for Dixon. Dixon managed to take his car the full distance, finishing a highly creditable fourth place at an average speed of 55 mph."  Austin Harris has two excellent photographs of the race, Dixon's car is number 8.  

  
1922 Land's End Trial Both Dixon and Croucher entered this event with their Coventry Premiers. .  The Motor described this as the "hardest trial yet"". Dixon did not manage to finish

1923 Colmore Cup The Colmore Cup was organised by Sutton Coldfield and N Birmingham AC, popularly known as SUNBAC. It was primarily an event for motorcycles, it also included classes for 3-wheelers and for cars up to 1100cc. It was held on 24 Feb 1923. Atkinson tells us that Dixon drove a 10 hp Singer and Bicknell a 10 hp Coventry Premier:

Austin Harris has an excellent photo of Dixon leading the chase up.  Atkinson believes that the Austin Harris photo in this link is of Dixon's car.

1923 Land's End Trial This event was always held on the Easter weekend. This year was a drier occasion than usual and Dixon won a gold medal. 

1924 Colmore Cup

1924 Land's End Trial Held at Easter, Dixon was unable to finish as his Singer 10 sheared a key in the rear axle almost as soon as he started - on the start line in Slough.

1924 RAC Small Car Trial - Singer entered two cars to be driven by Dixon and Bicknell in this trial in Wales, but at the last minute both cars were withdrawn shortly before the race with no explanation.

Final days

Dixon retired from professional racing after 1924 to concentrate on running the family confectioners shop in Clacton-on-Sea. But he kept his hand in. He was a close friend of Alan Cobham and took part in Sir Alan Cobham's Flying Circus when it came to Clacton. Paddy his son, remembers seeing Dixon walking on the wings of an Avro 5504K biplane.

Dixon joined the Clacton Chamber of Commerce and was appointed president in 1931. Dixon was a chain smoker and consumed a great deal of alcohol and he developed stomach cancer. The last two years of his life were painful and he lived on morphine and brandy. He died 21 March 1935 in Frinton and is buried at Kirby Cross cemetery.

References

1886 births
1935 deaths
British racing drivers